Rodney Lewis Jensen (born November 16, 1953) is an American basketball coach who was most recently a women's basketball assistant coach for Utah State.

Coaching career
Jensen graduated from the University of Redlands in 1975 with a degree in business administration. He was an assistant coach at Redlands from 1980 to 1982, after which he served as assistant coach at Penn State for the 1982–83 season under Dick Harter.

After being an assistant coach at Boise State under Bobby Dye from 1983 to 1995, Jensen was head coach at Boise State from 1995 to 2002. In seven seasons, Jensen had a 109–93 record at Boise State. During his tenure, Boise State played in three different conferences: the Big Sky Conference in his first season, the Big West Conference from 1996 to 2001, and the Western Athletic Conference in his final season. Boise State won the East Division title in a tie with New Mexico State in the 1998–99 season but never made any postseason tournaments during Jensen's tenure. In March 2002, athletic director Gene Bleymaier fired Jensen, with one year remaining on Jensen's contract.

Jensen was an assistant coach from 2002 to 2004 at Virginia under Pete Gillen. In 2005, he joined Mike Dement's coaching staff at UNC Greensboro. In 2006, Jensen was promoted to associate head coach, a position he would hold until 2010.

After 8 seasons away from the state of Idaho, Jensen became head coach at the College of Idaho, serving from 2010 to 2013. The College of Idaho opted not to renew Jensen's contract after Jensen's third season. Jensen then joined Ken Bone's staff at Washington State for the 2013–14 season.

From 2015 to 2018, Jensen was an assistant coach for Washington State Cougars women's basketball under June Daugherty. In 2019, he became an assistant coach for Utah State Aggies women's basketball under Jerry Finkbeiner.

Head coaching record

References

External links
 Utah State bio
Washington State bio
College of Idaho bio
UNC Greensboro bio
Virginia bio

1953 births
Living people
American men's basketball coaches
Boise State Broncos men's basketball coaches
College men's basketball head coaches in the United States
College of Idaho Coyotes men's basketball coaches
Penn State Nittany Lions basketball coaches
UNC Greensboro Spartans men's basketball coaches
University of Redlands alumni
Virginia Cavaliers men's basketball coaches
Washington State Cougars men's basketball coaches